Pseudolaguvia assula is a species of catfish from the Reu River in the Chitwan Valley near the confluence with the Rapti River in the Ganges drainage of Nepal.

References

Catfish of Asia
Taxa named by Heok Hee Ng
Taxa named by Kevin W. Conway
Fish described in 2013
Erethistidae